Gerard Friel (July 8, 1943 – August 20, 2007) was a college basketball coach, known for his 20-year tenure at New Hampshire where he is the school's all-time winningest coach.

After graduating from Oswego State in 1965, Friel began his coaching career in upstate New York at Fulton High School for a season, until he joined Bob Cousy's staff as an assistant coach at Boston College. During his time with the Eagles, the team advanced to the NCAA Tournament in 1967 and 1968, along with the NIT championship game in 1969.

Friel was named the head coach of New Hampshire in 1969, and coached for 20 years until his retirement in 1989. During the 1973-74 and 1982-83 season, Friel guided the Wildcats to a 16 wins, which was the most wins in school history until the 2013-14 season. For his coaching efforts during the 1982-83 season, UNH shared the ECAC North regular season title, and Friel was named ECAC North Coach of the Year, along with the U.S. Basketball Writers Association All-District Coach of the Year.

After his retirement from coaching, Friel embarked on an administrative career in the UNH athletic department as both Director of University Athletic Relations, and Director of Athletic Fundraising, along with serving as Vice President of the UNH Foundation.

Friel died on August 20, 2007 after a long battle with illness.

Head coaching record

References 

1943 births
2007 deaths
American men's basketball coaches
Basketball coaches from New York (state)
Boston College Eagles men's basketball coaches
High school basketball coaches in the United States
New Hampshire Wildcats men's basketball coaches
People from Durham, New Hampshire
Sportspeople from Strafford County, New Hampshire
Sportspeople from Utica, New York
State University of New York at Oswego alumni